Nerijus Beiga (born 4 March 1972) is a Lithuanian breaststroke swimmer. He competed at the 1992 Summer Olympics and the 1996 Summer Olympics.

References

External links
 

1972 births
Living people
Lithuanian male breaststroke swimmers
Olympic swimmers of Lithuania
Swimmers at the 1992 Summer Olympics
Swimmers at the 1996 Summer Olympics
Sportspeople from Kaunas
20th-century Lithuanian people
21st-century Lithuanian people